Andrew Willis (born 3 December 1990) is an English former competitive swimmer who has represented Great Britain at the Olympics, the FINA World Championships and the European Championships, and England at the Commonwealth Games.

Career

Early Career (2010-2012) 
Willis competed at the 2010 Commonwealth Games, where he finished 4th in the 200-metre breaststroke, and in the 2011 World Championships, where he made the final for the same event and finished 8th. At the 2012 Summer Olympics in London, he competed in the men's 200-metre breaststroke, finishing in 3rd place overall in the heats and qualifying for the final where he finished in 8th place.  He was one of the very few British swimmers to achieve a personal best at the 2012 Olympics.

Later Career (2012-present) 

Willis finished 4th in the 2013 World Championships and in the 2013 European Championships (SC) (both in the 200-metre breaststroke). He finished 4th in the 2014 European Championships and went on to win a bronze medal at the 2014 Commonwealth Games in the 200-metre breaststroke final in Glasgow. He finished 4th in the 2015 World Championships and won a bronze medal in the 2015 European Championships (SC) in the 200-metre breaststroke. He participated in the 2016 European Championships, and finished 4th in the final of the 200-metre breaststroke in the 2016 Summer Olympics in Rio. He went on to win a silver medal in the 2016 World Championships (SC). Willis made the final for both the 100-metre and 200-metre breaststroke in the 2018 Commonwealth Games, where he finished 8th and 4th respectively. In July 2018, Willis retired from competitive swimming.

Personal bests 
As of August 2018

References

External links
 Andrew Willis at British Swimming (archived)
 
 
 
 
 

1990 births
Living people
British male swimmers
Olympic swimmers of Great Britain
Swimmers at the 2012 Summer Olympics
Male breaststroke swimmers
Commonwealth Games bronze medallists for England
Swimmers at the 2014 Commonwealth Games
People from Frimley
Swimmers at the 2016 Summer Olympics
Commonwealth Games medallists in swimming
Medalists at the FINA World Swimming Championships (25 m)
Team Bath swimmers
Medallists at the 2014 Commonwealth Games